Harendra Coomar Mookherjee (3 October 1887 – 7 August 1956), also spelt as H.C. Mukherjee, was the Vice-President of the Constituent Assembly of India for drafting the Constitution of India before Partition of India, and the third Governor of West Bengal after India became a republic with partition into India and Pakistan.

He was an educationalist, prominent Christian leader of Bengal, and was the chairman of the Minority rights committee and Provincial constitution committee of the Constituent Assembly—consisting of indirectly elected representatives to draft the Constitution of India, including for provinces of present Pakistan and Bangladesh (then East Bengal) – the assembly considered only Muslims and Sikhs as religious minorities – after India became republic, the same Constituent Assembly became the first Parliament of India in 1947.

Biography
Born in Bengali family in Bengal, he did MA, PhD, D.Litt, and was the first Indian to receive a Doctor of Philosophy degree (from the University of Calcutta). Mookerjee's doctorate was in English literature, and he went on to become a philanthropist, and teacher.

At Calcutta University, he served at various positions—as lecturer, secretary, council of Post-Graduate Teaching in Arts, Inspector of Colleges, professor of English from 1936 to 1940, and head of English department. He was later nominated to "Bengal Legislative Council" and elected to "Bengal Legislative Assembly."

While he was vice-president of the Constituent Assembly of India, and chairman of the Minority rights sub-committee and Provincial constitution committee, he began suggesting reservation for the upliftment of minorities in all fields, including politics. With partition of India, he changed his stance and limited it to provision for preservation of the language and culture of minorities—over the period, this has been interpreted to open educational institutes and other institutions by minority communities.

Following the dissolution of the Constituent Assembly, Dr. Mookerjee was appointed Governor of West Bengal from 1 November 1951 through 7 August 1956. While working as Bengal governor, he served as the president of "Desh Bandhu Memorial Society" from 1953. He died in office on 7 August 1956 in Calcutta.

Christian leader
He represented Bengali Christians in Bengal, and after his entry into national politics, he was elected as the president of "All India Council of Indian Christians," representing All-Indian Christians other than Anglo-Indians.

He was also the member of Indian National Congress and participated in national movements representing Bengali Christian community. He confessed to his community as:

He was the only candidate to be unanimously nominated for Vice-Presidency, with a resolution moved by Pattabhi Sitaramayya, a member of Indian National Congress and Constituent Assembly of India; consequently, he expressed his gratitude in the Constituent Assembly of India that met in the Constitution Hall, New Delhi as:

See also
 Constituent Assembly – India

References

External links
 Minorities Sub-Committee – H.C. Mookherjee
 Constituent Assembly :  The Minority Community Chairman Mr. Harendra Coomar Mookerjee represented all Christians 
 A Mind to Work
 Debate in the Constituent Assembly
 Buddhism and the Parliament of Religions 

Indian civil servants
Bengali people
Indian Christian religious leaders
University of Calcutta alumni
Academic staff of the University of Calcutta
Surendranath Law College alumni
Governors of West Bengal
Members of the Constituent Assembly of India
1877 births
1956 deaths